The Visita de San José de Magdalena was a Catholic visita located in Baja California Sur, Mexico. The visita was founded by Dominican missionary Joaquín Valero in 1774 as an extension of Misión Santa Rosalía de Mulegé.

History

Building a visita, or subordinate mission station, at the site 16 kilometers west of the Gulf of California was initially proposed by the Franciscan missionary Francisco Palóu prior to the Dominicans' assumption of responsibility for the Baja California missions.

The visita was terminated when the mission at Mulegé was closed in 1828. Ruined walls of stone and adobe brick survive at the site.

See also

 Spanish missions in Baja California Sur

References
 Vernon, Edward W. 2002. Las Misiones Antiguas: The Spanish Missions of Baja California, 1683–1855. Viejo Press, Santa Barbara, California.

Missions in Baja California Sur
Mulegé Municipality
1774 establishments in New Spain